"Watan Hamārā Āzād Kashmīr" is the national anthem adopted by Azad Kashmir, a region in the northern part of the Indian Subcontinent currently administered by Pakistan. It is based on a poem of the same name written in the mid-1960s by Hafeez Jaalandhari. It was inspired during the Indo-Pakistani War of 1965.

See also
Flag of Azad Kashmir
Government of Azad Kashmir

References

Azad Kashmir
Asian anthems
National anthems